Polyommatus aedon is a butterfly of the family Lycaenidae. It was described by Hugo Theodor Christoph in 1887. It is found in central Anatolia, Kurdistan province of Iran, the Caucasus and Elburz Mountains.

References

Butterflies described in 1887
Polyommatus
Butterflies of Asia